The McAfee IntruShield is a network-based intrusion prevention sensor appliance that is used in prevention of zero-day, DoS (Denial of Service) attacks, spyware, malware, botnets and VoIP threats. It is now called McAfee Network Security Platform.

References

External links
http://www.mcafee.com/us/local_content/datasheets/ds_intrushield_ips_app_ent.pdf
^^ Broken ^^
Computer network security